Viacom Entertainment Store was a proposed chain of merchandise stores offering product based on Viacom owned properties, including Star Trek, Nickelodeon, MTV, VH1 and other Paramount Pictures properties.

The first (and only) Viacom Entertainment Store opened at 600 Michigan Avenue in Chicago, Illinois, on May 23, 1997. The store's grand opening party was attended by celebrities tied to the company at the time, including Jon Bon Jovi and Jenny McCarthy. Flagship stores had been planned for large metropolitan areas around the United States, all in response to the success of the Disney Store, Warner Bros. Studio Store, and Discovery Channel Store concepts.

In addition, more than a dozen standalone Nickelodeon stores opened during 1997 and 1998:

The Chicago flagship failed to meet the company's expectations, and the company announced it would shutter it and the Nickelodeon stores in 1999. The store closed on January 17, 1999, while the Nickelodeon stores gradually closed throughout the year.

Citations

Paramount Global
Defunct retail companies of the United States
Retail companies established in 1997
Retail companies disestablished in 1999